The Review of Radical Political Economics is a quarterly peer-reviewed academic journal published by SAGE Publishing on behalf of the Union for Radical Political Economics. It was established in 1968 and covers research on heterodox economics and political economy, broadly defined. The editor is Enid Arvidson (University of Texas at Arlington).

Abstracting and indexing
The journal is abstracted and indexed in the Social Sciences Citation Index. According to the Journal Citation Reports, the journal has a 2017 impact factor of 0.579, ranking it 281st out of 353 journals in the category "Economics".

See also
 Real-World Economics Review

References

External links

 Union for Radical Political Economics

Economics journals
English-language journals
Political economy
Publications established in 1969
Quarterly journals
SAGE Publishing academic journals